The 1994–95 season was the 56th season in UE Lleida's existence, and their 1st year in Segunda División after relegation, and covered the period from July 1, 1994, to June 30, 1995.

First-team squad

Transfers

In

Squad stats
Updated to games played on 30 June 1994. Only lists players who made an appearance or were on the bench.
Apps = Appearance(s); CS = Clean sheet(s);  G = Goal(s);  YC = Yellow card(s); L = League; C = Cup.To see the table ordered by certain column title click that column header icon  once or twice.
Goalkeepers

Outfield players

Competitions

Pre-season

Segunda División

Play off

Copa del Rey

Results summary

1995
Lleida
Lleida
Lleida